The Saint Louis–SIU Edwardsville men's soccer rivalry is an American college soccer rivalry between the Saint Louis University Billikens and Southern Illinois University Edwardsville Cougars. The winner of each year's game receives the Bronze Boot.

History 
In the late 1950s through early 1970s, the Saint Louis Billikens men's soccer program was in its golden age, and won all 10 of its NCAA Division I Men's Soccer Championship titles during that span. The program became noteworthy for focusing on recruiting domestic talent from the Saint Louis region rather than other top college programs that were reliant on international recruitment. The talent pool of players from the St. Louis region caused nearby universities such as Quincy, Rockhurst, and SIU Edwardsville to experience strong soccer seasons as well.

After Saint Louis experienced Division I success, SIU Edwardsville also experienced success with their program winning the inaugural Division II national championship in 1972, then moving to Division I and winning that title in 1979.  Due to the proximity of the schools, early matches between the schools attracted large crowds to their games. In 1971, the  Catholic Youth Council of St. Louis (CYC) initiated the annual Bronze Boot match which would be a trophy awarded annually to the regular season match up between SLU and SIUE. The popularity saw crowd sizes that set college soccer records, including the highest ever attended college soccer match for a regular season game: 22,512 between the two sides on October 30, 1980. From 1972 through 1985, the games were played at Busch Stadium to accommodate the large crowds.

In 1995, the series ended when SIU Edwardsville's program moved down to Division II along with the school's other sports. In 2007, the Cougars' athletic program was elevated to Division I. With the move, speculation rose about the teams playing again and resuming the series, although it remained dormant for another decade. Despite this, the teams played each other in spring season friendlies and preseason friendlies.

The series resumed when both programs agreed to play in a home-and-home series in 2018 and 2019.

Coach Bob Guelker 
The  Billikens' program was begun as a club program in 1958 by St. Louis U. alumnus Bob Guelker. After going 4–1–0 in that first season, the administration promoted the team to varsity status in 1959. The new team was 11–1–0 and won the inaugural NCAA Soccer Championship. The Billikens defended their title in 1960 and won again in 1962, 1963, and 1965 under Coach Guelker.

In 1966, SIU Edwardsville began establishing an NCAA College Division (now Division II) athletic program. In doing so, SIUE hired away two coaches from St. Louis U.'s higher profile University Division (now Division I) program. Bob Guelker was hired as the Cougars' first soccer coach, and he would later succeed Harry Gallatin as athletic director. As he had done at SLU, Coach Guelker quickly turned his new program into a regional and national power. In their first three seasons of eligibility. the Cougars were in the NCAA Tournament and nationally ranked. 1972 was the first year of the NCAA College Division Men's Soccer Championship. As his Billikens had won the first NCAA title in 1959, Guelker's Cougars won the first College Division/Division II crown in 1972. After the 1972 season, SIU Edwardsville and a number of other schools that emphasized their soccer programs took advantage of a then-current NCAA rule that allowed a Division II school to play one sport in Division I and moved into the higher division. In addition to winning the first NCAA title in 1969 and the first Division II title in 1972, in 1979, Guelker's Cougars won Division I, and he became the first coach to win Division I and II titles and the only coach to win both divisions at the same school.

Results 

↑ = NCAA Tournament game

See also 
 Soccer in St. Louis
 Saint Louis Billikens men's soccer
 SIU Edwardsville Cougars men's soccer

References 

College soccer rivalry trophies in the United States
College soccer rivalries in the United States
Saint Louis Billikens men's soccer
SIU Edwardsville Cougars men's soccer
Awards established in 1971
1971 establishments in Illinois
1971 establishments in Missouri